Valeria Ciavatta (born 16 January 1959) is a Sammarinese politician, who was a co-captain-regent (joint head of state) of San Marino along with Luca Beccari for the semester of April to September 2014. She is a member of the Popular Alliance of Democrats.

Political history
Ciavatta was co-captain-regent alongside Giovanni Lonfernini from October 2003 to March 2004. On 27 July 2006, she became the interior minister of San Marino. She was a Christian Democrat for many years, before becoming a founding member of the Popular Alliance in the early 1990s.

Honors 

  Order of Merit of the Italian Republic (Italy, 2014)

References
 Index Ci-Cl. Rulers.org. Accessed 2010-01-20.
 October 2003. Rulers.org. Accessed 2010-01-20.

1959 births
Living people
People from Borgo Maggiore
University of Urbino alumni
21st-century women politicians
Captains Regent of San Marino
Members of the Grand and General Council
Female heads of government
Female heads of state
Government ministers of San Marino
Popular Alliance (San Marino) politicians
Women government ministers of San Marino
Female interior ministers